Upward Bound is a federally funded educational program within the United States.

Upward Bound may also refer to:
Upward Bound Math Science, an American program for high school students who are underprivileged or are the first person in their family to attend college
Upward Bound High School in Hartwick, New York, is the first alternative education program in Otsego County
Upward Bound Youth Ministries in Cincinnati, Ohio, USA, associated with Allen Temple AME Church